America Athene Olivo (born January 5, 1978) is an American actress and singer best known as a member of the band Soluna, for her roles in the films Bitch Slap (2009), Friday the 13th (2009) and Maniac (2012), as well as starring in the Broadway musical Spider-Man: Turn Off the Dark.

Personal life
Born in Van Nuys, California, she has dual citizenship to the United States and Canada. Olivo is the daughter of Danica d'Hondt, of Belgian and Irish descent, Miss Canada in 1959, and winemaker Nello Olivo, of Italian and Basque descent. She married actor Christian Campbell in 2009. Their first child, a daughter, was born in 2012, but died three days later due to the genetic condition Edwards syndrome.

Career

Music and modeling
Olivo appeared on the cover of the June 2009 issue of Playboy magazine. Inside, she appears in seven fully nude photos, shot by fashion photographer Terry Richardson.

Stage and screen
The Soluna pilot opened many doors for Olivo, allowing her the opportunity to return to her roots in the theater when she performed the lead female role in a new musical Hotel C'est L'Amour, at The Blank Theatre in Los Angeles. In 2007, Olivo was nominated for an LA Weekly Theater Award for originating the role of "Marie" in this production.

Olivo recently starred in the new Broadway musical Spider-Man: Turn Off the Dark as a swing and understudy for the lead role of "Arachne". Previews began on November 28, 2010. When Natalie Mendoza, who starred as Arachne, suffered a concussion at that first preview, Olivo played the role for several weeks in December 2010. The physically demanding role involves aerial sequences, including being spun upside-down. When Mendoza unexpectedly left the show permanently later that month, the role of Arachne went to T.V. Carpio instead of Olivo, who remained as understudy. When Carpio was injured in March 2011 and withdrew from the show for two weeks, Olivo performed the role again.  Olivo left the show on April 17, 2011, when the show closed for revisions. She did not return when performances resumed May 12.

Aside from performing on stage, she quickly became busy outside of her musical career with Soluna, appearing as a guest star in numerous television series such as House, General Hospital, The Brother's Garcia, How I Met Your Mother, Jake In Progress, Cuts, Blue Bloods, Law & Order: Criminal Intent, NCIS: Los Angeles, "Warehouse 13". Currently recurring on Degrassi: The Next Generation, Olivo continues to perform as a singer, recording original music and performing covers for films.

In 2007, Olivo completed features titled The Last Resort and Love Shack. In 2008, she was featured in the DVD release The Thirst: Blood War starring opposite Tony Todd and Jason Connery and the theatrical release Circle. Olivo's 2009 theatrical releases in leading roles are action/comedy Bitch Slap and Michael Bay's 2009 version of Friday the 13th. In February 2009, she wrapped the feature film Neighbor, where she met husband Christian Campbell. More recently she filmed the remake of Maniac starring Elijah Wood, No One Lives starring Luke Evans and Conception starring David Arquette.  Recently Olivo joined the cast of Chicago PD, a spin-off of Chicago Fire.

In 2013, Olivo and husband Christian Campbell began development of a script based on the life of Olivo's uncle, Olympic gold medal winner Walter D'Hondt.

In 2013, Olivo became the spokesperson for Baby Quest Foundation founded by Pamela Hirsch to help raise funds for medical expenses imposed on infertile couples. She had a role in the spy action film Mission: Impossible – Rogue Nation (2015).

Filmography

References

External links
America Olivo at MySpace
America Olivo at MySpace Music

America Olivo at FEARnet
Interview

21st-century American actresses
Actresses from Los Angeles
American film actresses
American people of Basque descent
American people of Belgian descent
American people of Canadian descent
American people of Chilean descent
American people of Irish descent
American people of Italian descent
American television actresses
Hispanic and Latino American actresses
Hispanic and Latino American musicians
Juilliard School alumni
Living people
People from San Fernando, California
1978 births
21st-century American singers
21st-century American women singers
American stage actresses
Best Musical or Comedy Actress Golden Globe (film) winners
Hispanic and Latino American women singers